Dudnikov v. Chalk & Vermilion Fine Arts, Inc., 514 F.3d 1063 (10th Cir. 2008), was decided by the Tenth Circuit in January 2008. The Tenth Circuit overturned a dismissal granted by the District Court upon a motion to dismiss for lack of personal jurisdiction under FRCP12(b)(2). Dudnikov addresses the issues that arise regarding personal jurisdiction and the internet, applying standards set by the Supreme Court of the United States in a line of cases that progressively defined the doctrine and its scope in light of the Fourteenth Amendment.

Issue
The issue presented to the Tenth Circuit was whether the court held specific jurisdiction over the defendants due to their interactions with the plaintiffs via the internet services of eBay.

Facts
The plaintiffs, Karen Dudnikov and Michael Meadors, were “power sellers” on eBay, dealing in a variety of fabrics and handmade crafts. One of the fabrics they listed for auction made a play upon famous works by the artist Erté titled Symphony in Black and Ebony on White (sic). The original artwork portrayed an elegant woman with a sleek dog upon a leash. The fabric sold by Dudnikov portrayed Betty Boop with her dog, “Pudgy,” in a similar pose.

Defendant Chalk & Vermilion Fine Arts, Inc. is the American Agent for British corporation SevenArts, who owns the copyright for the Erté works of interest. Upon discovering the sale of the Betty Boop fabric, Chalk & Vermilion filed a request with eBay through their Verified Rights Owner Program (“VeRO”) for a notice of claimed infringement. Under this program, eBay will terminate an item’s auction when it receives such a notice from a VeRO member, who certifies under penalty of perjury that it believes an item infringes its copyright.

After receiving the Notice of Claimed Infringement (NOCI) notice from eBay canceling the auction, Dudnikov contacted Chalk & Vermilion and SevenArts to request that the NOCI be withdrawn, offering to refrain from relisting the disputed item. She was concerned that a NOCI filing would leave a black mark on her eBay reputation. SevenArts refused to withdraw the notice, prompting Dudnikov to challenge SevenArts’ copyright claim with eBay. SevenArts responded by notifying Dudnikov that it intended to file a federal court action within ten days. Before SevenArts took the legal action they threatened, the plaintiffs in this case filed for a declaratory judgment that the contested fabric portraying Betty Boop did not infringe upon SevenArts’ copyright.

Procedural
The plaintiffs brought a declaratory judgment action in the United States District Court of Colorado to resolve the issue of whether the plaintiff’s sale of Betty Boop fabric infringed upon defendant’s copyright. A FRCP 12(b)(2) motion to dismiss for lack of personal jurisdiction was filed by defendants, and granted by the District Court. Plaintiffs filed for this appeal.

Court’s Reasoning
The Tenth Circuit applied the standard for determining personal jurisdiction laid out by the Supreme Court. Distilling the holdings of several Supreme Court cases, the Tenth Circuit formulated and applied a five-part test to determine whether specific jurisdiction is proper. Proper exercise of due process requires that the defendants (1) have committed an intentional action, (2) that the action was expressly aimed at the forum state, (3) that defendants had knowledge that the brunt of the injury would be felt in the forum state, (4) that the plaintiff’s injuries arose out of the defendant’s forum related activities, (5) and that traditional notions of fair play and substantial justice are not offended.

Intentional Action
The Court held that the sending of the NOCI was an intentional act designed to terminate the plaintiff’s auction. The defendants additionally threatened to bring suit within ten days if the NOCI was not enforced. Furthermore, the Court aligned itself with a ruling by the Ninth Circuit holding that the intentional act does not need to be wrongful since such a requirement would be tantamount to an assessment of the merits of a case.

Action was Expressly Aimed at the Forum State
Though the defendants argued that the NOCI was sent to eBay in California, the Court held that the intent of the defendants sending the NOCI was to request eBay to remove the auction for the infringing material. Also, defendants contacted the plaintiffs directly, issuing a threat to sue them in federal court to prevent the future sale of the fabric. Furthermore, viewing the facts in a light most favorable to the plaintiff as required by the standard of judgment for a 12(b) motion to dismiss, the Court found that the defendants knew that plaintiffs were located in Colorado since notice was provided on their eBay listing.

Brunt of the Injury Felt in the Forum State
The Court found that defendants knew that plaintiffs’ business was in Colorado, and thus that the effects of the NOCI would be felt there. Following Calder, the Court further determined that the defendants additionally took intentional actions that were expressly aimed at the forum state, as evidenced by the defendant’s intentional cancellation of the plaintiff’s auction.

Plaintiff’s Injuries Arose out of Defendant’s Forum Related Activities
Whereas the Court was confronted with selection of but-for causation and proximate causation when analyzing this issue, they held that both theories of causation were satisfied by the sending of the NOCI to eBay by the plaintiff as well as the email exchange between defendants and plaintiffs. Since the NOCI declared that defendants believed in good faith that plaintiffs infringed their copyright, the merits of the declaratory judgment suit dealt directly with the same issue raised by the NOCI.

Traditional Notions of Fair Play and Substantial Justice are not Offended
The court evaluated the issue of fair play and substantial justice by considering factors of (1) the defendant’s burden, (2) the forum state’s interests in the dispute, (3) the plaintiff’s interest in receiving convenient and effectual relief, (4) the judicial system’s interest in efficiently resolving controversies, (5) the shared interest of the several states in furthering social policy. Based upon these factors, the court decided that none of the factors weighed definitively in favor of the defendants. This is supported by the fact that defendants’ threat of litigation showed they were already willing to litigate in a federal court on the issue.

Holding
The Court held that specific jurisdiction was proper over defendants Chalk & Vermilion and SevenArts since they committed an intentional action directly aimed at the forum state of Colorado, knew that plaintiffs would feel the impact of their action within the forum state, and were not unduly prejudiced by the exercise of jurisdiction.

Significance of Case
Dudnikov outlines the treatment of personal jurisdiction with regard to the internet for the Tenth Circuit. The court applied traditional tests for personal jurisdiction with regard to due process. The court mentions briefly in its opinion that the question of jurisdiction in this case was not affected by any other statutes applicable to the complaint. Thus, Dudnikov is effective as precedent for deciding personal jurisdiction within the Tenth Circuit as long as any other laws applied to the case confer the maximum jurisdiction possible consistent with due process.

United States Court of Appeals for the Tenth Circuit cases
2008 in United States case law
EBay litigation
United States copyright case law
Betty Boop
United States civil procedure case law